Coleophora lucida is a moth of the family Coleophoridae. It is found in Zhejiang in eastern China.

The wingspan is about 10 mm.

References

lucida
Moths described in 1989
Moths of Asia